Barry Goldwater (1909–1998) was an American conservative politician.

Goldwater may also refer to:

Goldwater (surname), including a list of people with the name
Barry Goldwater High School located in Phoenix, Arizona
Goldwater Institute, a Phoenix, Arizona-based think tank named for Barry Goldwater
Goldwater Lake, a reservoir on Bannon Creek in North Central Arizona
Goldwater rule, a psychiatric ethics principle, named for Barry Goldwater
Goldwater's, American department store owned by Michel Goldwasser, grandfather of Barry Goldwater
The Goldwaters, a folk group named for Barry Goldwater

See also
Goldwasser (surname), the original surname of the Barry Goldwater family, prior to anglicisation by an ancestor at some point in the 19th century
Goldwasser, liqueur containing specks of gold